Ravi Babu is an Indian actor, director, writer and producer in the Telugu film industry. He has written and directed 15 films and starred in over 75 films.in his career

Career

His work earned an invitation to participate in a course at the Sony Institute in San Jose, California. After the course, Babu did a short stint at TV Asia as ENG producer and also doubled up as cameraman and editor.

In 1999, he started his own production house, Flying Frogs, initially to produce television commercials, but would later become a feature film production house.

Advertising career
Babu wrote and directed an advertising campaign with actress Tamannaah for Celkon phones. He also created an advertising campaign for N. Chandrababu Naidu, the Chief Minister of Andhra Pradesh for the last election.

Filmography

As director 

 All films are in Telugu except otherwise noted

As actor

Telugu

Tamil

Kannada

References

External links

Living people
Telugu male actors
Male actors in Telugu cinema
Male actors in Kannada cinema
Male actors in Tamil cinema
Telugu film directors
Telugu screenwriters
21st-century Indian film directors
20th-century Indian male actors
21st-century Indian male actors
Indian male film actors
Year of birth missing (living people)
Screenwriters from Vijayawada
Male actors from Vijayawada
Film directors from Andhra Pradesh
Film producers from Andhra Pradesh